Farringdon Halt was an intermediate station  on the Meon Valley line which ran from Alton to Fareham, England during the 20th century. A goods yard for loading agricultural produce was already sited there, and in 1930 a short wooden platform of one coach-length was built to serve the village. It opened on 1 May 1931, and from 1 May 1932 until 8 July 1934 was named Faringdon Platform, before reverting to the original name of Farringdon Halt.

Closure

The passenger service ceased on 7 February 1955. A particularly difficult line to construct the sidings were used intermittently for goods traffic until 13 August 1968 after which the track was lifted.

The site today
The site is now a small business/light industrial park. Coincidentally the access road to the modern site is along the former railway trackbed from the A32.

Route

See also 

 List of closed railway stations in Britain

References

External links 
  Details of route

Disused railway stations in Hampshire
Former Southern Railway (UK) stations
Railway stations in Great Britain opened in 1931
Railway stations in Great Britain closed in 1955